Uribealdea Rugby Kirol Elkartea is a Spanish rugby team based in Mungia.

History
The club was established in 2008 through a merger of Mungia RT and Kakarraldo Rugby Taldea .

Season to season

8 seasons in División de Honor B

References

External links
Spanish Rugby Union Fixtures 

Rugby clubs established in 2008
Rugby union teams in the Basque Country (autonomous community)
2008 establishments in Spain
Sport in Biscay